Frank Mercer (born 1928), is a male former diver who competed for England.

Diving career
He represented England in the 3 metres springboard at the 1954 British Empire and Commonwealth Games in Vancouver, Canada.

Personal life
He opened a dance school called the Bickley School of Dance, in St Augustines Avenue, Bickley in 1975 and the school has produced some of the world's leading ballroom dancers.

References

1928 births
English male divers
Possibly living people
Divers at the 1954 British Empire and Commonwealth Games
Commonwealth Games competitors for England